Gilles Coulier (born 30 October 1986) is a Belgian director/scriptwriter and producer known for the film 'Cargo' (2017) and the television series 'De Dag' ('The Day') and 'Bevergem' ('The Natives').

Coulier studied Audiovisual Arts at the Sint-Lukas Brussels University College of Art and Design. Graduation film of the 3rd Bachelor year was the Short film 'Iceland'.
This short was selected for the 2010 Cannes Film Festival  in the Cinefondation section, Abu Dhabi Film Festival and The Leeds Film Festival.

'Iceland' won a 'Flemish Film Fund' Wildcard in 2010 for Best Fiction Short at the International Shortfilm Festival of Leuven in December 2009 and the Sabam Prize for Best Belgian Short at the FIFIB Brussels. 
The film was shot in Ostend and tells the story of an ex-prisoner trying to pick up life.

The shortfilm 'Paroles'  was nominated for several International Film Festivals and was the Jury Prize Winner at the International Shortfilm Festival of Leuven in December 2010.
The film was shot in Ostend and tells the story of 2 brothers in search of their father.

Coulier graduated in September 2011 and used the 'Flemish Film Fund Wildcard' to create his first professional short 'Mont Blanc'. 
This short was produced by Dirk Impens for Menuet Films and was coached by Felix Van Groeningen, known as the
director of 'The Misfortunates' and 'The Broken Circle Breakdown'.
'Mont Blanc' was selected in April 2013 for the 2013 Cannes Film Festival in the Official Shortfilm Competition.

In 2012 he joined the writers room of Bevergem (The Natives) with Bart Vanneste, Wannes Cappelle and Dries Heyneman. 
Coulier founded production company 'De Wereldvrede' with actor Gilles De Schryver and Wouter Sap to produce the series.
Coulier directed the series in 2014 and when Bevergem aired in 2015 the results were unforeseen. A 25% marketshare for CANVAS, several international festivalselections and prizes.

in 2015 Coulier co-wrote and directed his first feature film, 'Cargo' with an international premiere at the San Sebastian Film Festival and a national premiere at The Ostend Film Festival. Cargo was nominated for over 20 festivals with highlights at the BFI London Film Festival, Göteborg Film Festival and the prize for 'Best Screenplay' at the Thessaloniki Film Festival. In 2017 Cargo was nominated for Les Magrittes du Cinema for Best Flemish Film.

In 2018 the series 'De Dag' ('The Day') aired. Coulier directed 8 out of 12 episodes, written by Jonas Geirnaert and Julie Mahieu.

In 2018 Gilles Coulier was awarded the Jo Röpke Award and the prestigious Cultural Award of the Royal University of Leuven for his work.

In February 2019 Coulier started as Director and Executive Producer on the first 4 episodes of 'War of the Worlds', a British/French co-production for Fox and CANAL+, based on the eponymous book by H.G. Wells.

In 2020 Coulier created with Maarten Moerkerke the series 'Lockdown' for VRT Broadcaster. It aired in 2021 and won the Student Jury Prize at Canneseries 2021.

Filmography

 Lockdown (2021)
 War of the Worlds (2019)
 De Dag / The Day (2018)
 Cargo (2017)
 Bevergem / The Natives (2015)
 Mont Blanc (2012)
 Paroles (2010)
 IJsland / Iceland (2009)

References

External links
 www.dewereldvrede.be
 https://www.imdb.com/name/nm3899315/?ref_=nmbio_bio_nm*

1986 births
Living people
Belgian film directors
Belgian screenwriters